Parasinilabeo longibarbus is a species of cyprinid fish endemic to China.

References

Fish described in 2006
Parasinilabeo